Coenobita rubescens is a species of terrestrial (land-living) hermit crab, family Coenobitidae. 

They are the only known terrestrial hermit crab species on the Atlantic coast of western Africa. They were first described by the German zoologist Richard Greeff in the West African islands of São Tomé and Rolas, after initially being misidentified as Coenobita rugosus.  They are able to venture far inland, in altitudes exceeding .  In spite of this, the ovigerous females must release the fertilized eggs in the ocean for the larvae to develop (as with all known species of terrestrial hermit crabs).

The species is presumably named for the dark red coloration of their exoskeleton.  Under Greeff's original observation, this species has a more elongated antennule and the left cheliped lacks the stridulation ridges (as such seen in C. rugosus), leading to the distinction.

As with other terrestrial hermit crab species, they are omnivorous. There are reports of this species carrying a sea urchin test in place of a more typical gastropod shell.

References 

Hermit crabs
Terrestrial crustaceans
Crustaceans described in 1884